Dexter Skeene (born 1 April 1964 in Trinidad and Tobago) is a former international Trinidadian footballer having played for Malta Carib Alcons, Maple Club, and the national team. Skeene is currently the CEO of the TT Pro League, having assumed the role of the country's highest level of league football on 1 April 2004.

Career

International
Skeene made his debut for the Trinidad and Tobago national team in 1998, and scored his first international goal on 17 April 1988 in a 4-0 1990 FIFA World Cup qualification match win over Guyana. Skeene was a member of the Strike Squad that was named during the 1990 FIFA World Cup qualifying campaign. Skeene scored his second international goal in a 1–2 friendly loss to Canada on 2 October 1988 at Queen's Park Oval. He would conclude his international career with two goals in successive matches during the 1991 Caribbean Cup with the first in a 7–0 win over Dominican Republic and the second in a 1–2 loss to Saint Lucia. In all international competitions, Skeene finished with 13 international appearances for Trinidad and Tobago and scored 4 goals.

International goals 
Scores and results list Trinidad and Tobago's goal tally first.

References

External links
Soca Warriors Online

1964 births
Living people
Trinidad and Tobago footballers
Trinidad and Tobago international footballers
Association football forwards